Boling Independent School District is a public school district based in the community of Boling, Texas (USA).  Located in Wharton County, a small portion of the district extends into Matagorda County. The district operates one high school, Boling High School.

Finances
As of the 2010-2011 school year, the appraised valuation of property in the district was $199,698,000. The maintenance tax rate was $0.104 and the bond tax rate was $0.000 per $100 of appraised valuation.

Academic achievement
In 2011, the school district was rated "recognized" by the Texas Education Agency.  Thirty-five percent of districts in Texas in 2011 received the same rating. No state accountability ratings will be given to districts in 2012. A school district in Texas can receive one of four possible rankings from the Texas Education Agency: Exemplary (the highest possible ranking), Recognized, Academically Acceptable, and Academically Unacceptable (the lowest possible ranking).

Historical district TEA accountability ratings
2011: Recognized
2010: Recognized
2009: Recognized
2008: Academically Acceptable
2007: Academically Acceptable
2006: Academically Acceptable
2005: Academically Acceptable
2004: Academically Acceptable

Schools
In the 2011-2012 school year, the district operated three schools.
Boling High School (Grades 9-12)
Iago Junior High School (Grades 6-8)
Newgulf Elementary School (Grades PK-5)

Special programs

Athletics
Boling High School participates in the boys sports of baseball, basketball, football, power lifting, cross county, and track. The school participates in the girls sports of basketball, softball, power lifting, cross country, and volleyball. Boling High School sports compete in UIL Class 3A (Division II in football).

See also

List of school districts in Texas
List of high schools in Texas
Newgulf, Texas

References

External links
 

School districts in Wharton County, Texas
School districts in Matagorda County, Texas
School districts established in 1928